Origin of the Alimonies is the fifth studio album by American rock band Liturgy. It was released on November 20, 2020, via bandleader Hunter Hunt-Hendrix's record label, YLYLCYN.

Performance
The album was performed by the band at the Roadburn Festival on 23 April 2022 in Tilburg. The band, consisting of guitarist Mario Miron, bassist Tia Vincent-Clark and Leo Didkovsky on drums alongside Hunt-Hendrix, was accompanied by a classical orchestra. For this occasion a concomitant film was made by Hunter Hunt-Hendrix.

Track listing

References

2020 albums
Liturgy (band) albums